"What You Gonna Do???" (stylised in all caps as "WHAT YOU GONNA DO???") is a song by English indie pop band Bastille. It was released on 30 July 2020 as the first single from their EP Goosebumps. The song was written by Dan Smith, who handled the production with Mark Crew. The song features Blur member, Graham Coxon, on guitar and vocals.

Background
Smith said, "This next phase feels like a new beginning. It's about completely tearing up our process, being spontaneous and starting again. We're just really excited by the new songs. I think we're making some of the best music we’ve ever made. We want to put it out now and not wait for the whole album to be done before anyone starts to hear it. This is about where we are now and hearing us in real-time." According to a press release, the song is about "the frustration with the attention economy in which our eyes and ears are fiercely fought over, yet so few use it for anything worthwhile". Smith said, "Whether we're outside or online we're perpetually hit by so many people vying for our attention, but we're just left rolling our eyes at how rarely it's for anything that decent or funny."

Music video
A music video for the song was released on 30 July 2020 at a total length of two minutes and twenty three seconds. It was directed and created by London-based British-Iranian animator, Reza Dolatabadi, and took seven weeks to make.

Track listing
Digital download
 "What You Gonna Do???" – 2:11

7-inch vinyl
 "Survivin'
 "What You Gonna Do???"

Charts

Weekly charts

Year-end charts

References

2020 songs
2020 singles
Animated music videos
Bastille (band) songs
Graham Coxon songs
Republic Records singles
Songs written by Dan Smith (singer)